The Enrichment Center Percussion Ensemble is a musical group based at the Enrichment Center, Winston-Salem, North Carolina formed from adults with developmental disabilities and professional musicians. It was founded in 1997 by
director Aaron Bachelder from members of the existing student body of the
Enrichment Center, an arts-based alternative day program for adults with
disabilities.

In spite of its members' lack of prior musical experience,
the group began performing within months, and was soon attracting the
attention of many in the arts and human services communities. Before
long, they had performed for thousands of people, alone and in
collaboration with such groups as The African American Dance Ensemble, Chimaera Physical Theatre, and more recently, The Open Dream Ensemble. The group's music is highly varied, ranging from neo-serialism to post- minimalist rock, as well as arrangements of American folk song and works drawing on Asian, Latin, and jazz traditions. Their first recording (Nomos), a collaboration with violinist Sarah Johnson on her CD Fiddler's Galaxy,
was released in 2000 on Albany Records, and subsequently premiered live
at the Southeastern Center for Contemporary Art (SECCA).   Their CD Three Pieces was released in 2005 on Microearth Records
, with guest
musicians Morgan Kraft, Erich Hubner of Man or Astro-man?, and Joel Lambdin, founder of the Harrisburg Chamber Players.
It has received airplay on regional college radio, and a portion of the
opening track "Parallax" was used in a television commercial for SECCA.
Their performance of "Wintersong" by Bachelder was included on the recent WUAG
(University of North Carolina at Greensboro) live compilation "18 watts is better than none". As Ken Keuffel,
in the Winston-Salem Journal, says, "[the] Ensemble illustrates the
power of music".

Erich Hubner engineered the live recordings done at the Enrichment Center on 16 track tape for the 2008 release "Ten Songs." The tapes were then taken and mixed by legendary NC musician Mitch Easter at his Fidelitorium Studio.

Guest musicians
Aaron Bachelder
Morgan Kraft
Erich Hubner
Joel Lambdin
Sarah Johnson
Jeffrey Dean Foster

Discography
"Nomos" featured on Fiddler's Galaxy Sarah Johnson Albany Records, 2000
Three Pieces released on Microearth Records, 2005
Ten Songs released by Microearth Records 2008

External links
Official Site
Article in Winston-Salem Journal, August 21, 2005

Musical groups established in 1997
Percussion ensembles
Musical groups from North Carolina